The Louisiana State Legislature is the state legislature of the U.S. state of Louisiana. It is a bicameral body, comprising the lower house, the Louisiana House of Representatives with 105 representatives, and the upper house, the Louisiana State Senate with 39 senators. Members of each house are elected from single-member districts of roughly equal populations.

The Louisiana State Legislature meets in the Louisiana State Capitol in Baton Rouge. In March 2023, Republicans gained a supermajority of the Louisiana legislature for the first in the history of Louisiana.

Early history
Jean Noel Destréhan and Allan Bowie Magruder was selected by the joint legislature to be Louisiana's first United States Senators on 3 September 1812. Destréhan resigned within a month and was replaced with Thomas Posey.

Terms
Members of both houses of the legislature serve a four-year term, with a term limit of three terms (twelve years). Term limits were passed by state voters in a constitutional referendum in 1995 and were subsequently added as Article III, §4, of the Louisiana Constitution. In 2007, some legislators had served their maximum terms and could not run again, being "termed out of office". The term limits are consecutive rather than lifetime.

Officers
The officers of each house of the legislature are elected at the beginning of each term to serve for four-year terms. The Louisiana House of Representatives elects from among its members a speaker and speaker pro tempore. Although the procedure is not mandated constitutionally, the speaker of the house is traditionally recommended by the governor of Louisiana to the body. The current speaker, Clay Schexnayder, a Republican, presides over the House. The house also elects its chief clerical officer, the clerk of the house, who is not an elected member. The Louisiana Senate elects its presiding officer, the president of the Senate, from among its membership; the position is also traditionally recommended by the governor. The current president is Page Cortez. Each house provides for the election of its officers.

From 1853 until the adoption of the Louisiana constitution of 1974, the lieutenant governor was designated to preside over the Louisiana Senate. In the 21st century, the lieutenant governor exercises powers delegated to him by the governor as provided by law. He also serves as governor in the event of a vacancy in the office, if the governor is unable to act as governor, or is out of the state. Since the lieutenant governor no longer serves as president of the Senate, he has been made an ex-officio member of each committee, board and commission on which the governor serves. (Louisiana Constitution Article IV, Section 6) Additionally, the lieutenant governor serves as head of the Louisiana Department of Culture, Recreation & Tourism.

Sessions and quorum
The legislature is required to convene in the state capitol in Baton Rouge for regular annual sessions. In even-numbered years, a general session convenes at noon on the second Monday in March to extend for no longer than 60 legislative days during a period of 85 days. In odd-numbered years, a limited jurisdiction session convenes at noon on the second Monday in April for no longer than 45 legislative days during a period of 60 days. The legislature also may convene for extraordinary sessions and for veto sessions.

The legislature is required to meet in an organizational session, which cannot exceed three days, on the date its members take office. A special session may be called by the governor or may be convened by the presiding officers of both houses upon a written petition of a majority of the elected members of each house. A special session is limited to the number of days stated in the proclamation, not to exceed 30 days. The power to legislate in a special session is limited to the objects specifically enumerated in the proclamation.

In order to constitute a quorum, both houses require a majority of members present; 53 members of the House of Representatives and 20 members of the Senate. A smaller number may adjourn from day to day and may compel the attendance of absent members. Each house is required to also keep a journal of its proceedings and have it published immediately after the close of each session.

Political immunity
Members of both houses of the Louisiana State Legislature are free from arrest, except for felony, during their attendance at sessions and committee meetings of their house and while going to and from them. No member shall be questioned elsewhere for any speech in either house.

Veto powers
The governor of Louisiana carries the power of the line-item veto. However, the legislature has the constitutional power to override a gubernatorial veto by a vote of two-thirds from each house.

See also
Louisiana House of Representatives
Louisiana State Senate
 List of Louisiana state legislatures
Government of Louisiana

Notes

External links
Louisiana State Legislature
Louisiana House of Representatives
Louisiana State Senate

 
Bicameral legislatures